Olean Armory is a historic armory building located at Olean in Cattaraugus County, New York. It was designed by State architects Isaac G. Perry (1890 structure) and Lewis Pilcher (1919 structure). It consists of a two-story, Tudor inspired administration building constructed in 1919, with an attached Romanesque drill shed constructed in 1890.  The building features a number of castellated style features such as turrets and buttresses.

It was listed on the National Register of Historic Places in 1995.

References

External links
Historical marker/historic landmark for Olean Armory in Olean, NY

Armories on the National Register of Historic Places in New York (state)
Infrastructure completed in 1890
Infrastructure completed in 1919
Buildings and structures in Cattaraugus County, New York
St. Bonaventure Bonnies basketball
National Register of Historic Places in Cattaraugus County, New York